Echimyopodidae is a family of mites in the order Astigmata. There are at least two genera and two described species in Echimyopodidae.

Genera
 Blomia 
 Marsupiopus

References

Further reading

 
 
 
 
 

Sarcoptiformes
Acari families